The Bakar mockery (Italian Beffa di Buccari), or Bakar raid, was a raid of the Italian Navy (Regia Marina) in the last year of World War I. Whilst it had little material effect on the war at sea, it was a particularly bold venture which had a welcome effect on Italian morale, which was at a low ebb following the defeat at Caporetto a few months prior.

Background
In World War I, Italy was allied to France and Britain against the Central Powers, Austria-Hungary and Germany. Italy’s campaign on land against the Austrian army had been stalemated for two and a half years, with little movement, though at the cost of huge casualties.
At sea, equality with the Austro-Hungarian Navy in capital ships had led to a deadlock, with neither side wishing to risk their loss; thus the war at sea in the Adriatic was a contest of small ships, of raids and patrols, of sudden actions by night, and of losses to mines and submarines. In this arena, the Italian Navy had developed a commando force of fast torpedo boats, the MAS, which attracted men with a buccaneering spirit.

In November 1917 the deadlock was upset by an Austrian offensive, supported by German forces made available by the collapse of the Russian front. In the battle of Caporetto, the Italian army was defeated, and in a period of three weeks the front was pushed back 50 miles, to within striking distance of Venice.

Action
The Bakar raid was conceived by the Italians as an attack on Austrian shipping in the harbour at Buccari (now Bakar, in Croatia) a port in an enclosed bay (the Bay of Bakar) near Rijeka, at the head of the Kvarner Gulf.
As it lay 80 km into a sheltered waterway, it was thought to be beyond attack, so the raid was intended as a psychological, as well as a physical, assault. 

The operation was led by Capitano di Fregata Costanzo Ciano, and comprised three MAS boats, with a total crew of 30 men. Also on board was Gabriele D’Annunzio, the poet.

On 10 February 1918 the three MAS boats, under tow by torpedo boats to conserve fuel, and escorted by two destroyers and a scout, set out from their base and at 10 pm, after 14 hours sailing, entered the Farasina channel, the waterway between Istria and the island of Cherso (now Cres).

Several hours later, having evaded Austrian patrols and the shore batteries at Porto Re (now Kraljevica), the flotilla arrived outside the Bay. The MAS boats slipped their tows, and entered, as their escort withdrew. At about a mile from the target, the MAS switched from petrol engines to silenced electrical engines for the final approach and as closing with their targets the three fired their torpedoes, a total of six. However their boldness was not rewarded, and the torpedoes scored no hits; five became entangled in nets, or otherwise failed to explode, while the sixth exploded harmlessly, slightly damaging a freighter and raising the alarm. 

Despite the alert, the MAS boats were able to escape, and making a dash down the channel, regained the open sea where they were reunited with their escort.

Aftermath

Despite the lack of material success, the raid was a considerable fillip to Italian morale, as well as a psychological blow to the Austrians. In this, it resembled the Doolittle raid on Tokyo in the Second World War, and prefigured the Flight over Vienna, D’Annunzio’s air raid on the Austrian capital. The Bakar Mockery was celebrated in several booklets at the time and was heavily publicized by D’Annunzio, who understood its propaganda value.

MAS 96 is preserved at the Vittoriale degli italiani in Gardone Riviera.

Notes

References

 

Mediterranean naval operations of World War I
Battles and conflicts without fatalities
World War I raids